Biblis Tholus is an extinct Martian volcano located at , one of two volcanoes near the center of the Tharsis volcanism. Along with Ulysses Tholus, it is almost midway between Olympus Mons and the Tharsis Montes. Biblis Tholus lies in the Tharsis quadrangle.

In the middle of the volcano is a caldera, named Biblis Patera, believed to have formed as the result of collapse of the magma chamber during eruptions of the volcano.

See also

 Geography of Mars
 HiRISE
 Geology of Mars
 List of mountains on Mars by height
 Pedestal crater
 Volcanoes on Mars
 Volcanology of Mars

References

External links
Mars Express Page on Biblis Patera
Google Mars infrared view of Biblis Patera

Volcanoes of Mars
Mountains on Mars
Extinct volcanoes
Tharsis quadrangle